Jean de Dieu Soloniaina Razanadrakoto (born 26 February 1974) is an amateur boxer from Madagascar who qualified for the 2008 Olympics at lightweight at the 2nd AIBA African 2008 Olympic Qualifying Tournament.

He defeated, among others, Achille Apie, in the Olympic qualification trials and, in the final, he won against Rasheed Lawal 9:2. He lost his Olympic debut to Francisco Vargas of Mexico.

External links
 Qualifier

1974 births
Living people
Lightweight boxers
Boxers at the 2008 Summer Olympics
Malagasy male boxers
Olympic boxers of Madagascar